Roger Diaz Pandaan (born January 2, 1970), known professionally as Ogie Diaz, is a Filipino comedian, actor,  entertainment reporter, and talent manager. He is popularly known as "Pekto", the name of his character in the long-running former television show Palibhasa Lalake.

Biography
Born on 2 January 1970, Díaz was the sixth of eight siblings. His father was killed during a robbery in 1986 when Diaz was 16. Due to this tragedy, Diaz was not able to continue his higher education and focused on show business instead.

In 1987, Díaz began his career as an assistant to Cristy Fermin, who remains his close friend up to this date, at Mariposa Publications. In an interview, the latter revealed that he would beg loans from his neighbors for a transportation fare to arrive at Fermin's office at GMA Network. Diaz eventually became a writer during the early '90s; this provided him enough money as his family's breadwinner. Later in his career, Diaz tried his luck on talent managing and acting at ABS-CBN. Some of his notable talent artists include actress Liza Soberano and formerly comedian Vice Ganda.

Ogie met his partner Georgette del Rosario, who bore him five children. The couple are open members of the LGBT community. In 2017, Diaz published his book Pak! Humor about being a homosexual father.

Filmography

Film

Television

Showbiz Lingo (1992–1999) - showbiz segment
Ganda (1987–1996) - Jaime
Cristy Per Minute (1995–1999) - showbiz segment
Wansapanataym: Salamin (1997) - Menoy
Pwedeng Pwede (1999–2001) - Charlotte
Bituin (2002–2003) - Ogie
S2: Showbiz Sabado (2003) - host
Showbiz No. 1 (2004–2005) - host
Magandang Umaga, Pilipinas - showbiz segment (2004–2007)
Umagang Kay Ganda (2007–2008) - showbiz segment
That's My Doc (2008) - Indyanera Jones
Volta (2008) - Gas Napulgas
May Bukas Pa (2009–2010) - Atong
Momay (2010) - Mando
Entertainment Live - Host (2010–2012)
Mutya (2011) - Romel
Walang Hanggan (2012) - Kenneth
Showbiz Inside Report (2012–2013)
Bet on Your Baby - Guest
May Isang Pangarap
Huwag Ka Lang Mawawala
Buzz ng Bayan
Dyesebel
Nathaniel
FPJ's Ang Probinsyano
Home Sweetie Home
Born For You (2016)
The Blood Sisters (2018) - Bruce
Sandugo (2019)
Pinoy Big Brother: Kumunity Season 10 (2021) - Himself, virtual houseguest
PIE Night Long (2022) - Himself, guest host

Radio
Wow ang Showbiz (DWIZ); 2005
OMJ! (DZMM); 2013–2020

References

1970 births
Living people
Filipino male comedians
Filipino television personalities
Filipino radio personalities
Filipino gay actors
Filipino LGBT comedians
Gay comedians
People from Quezon City
Male actors from Metro Manila
ABS-CBN personalities